Osterøy is an island municipality in Vestland county, Norway. It is located in the traditional district of Nordhordland. The municipality encompasses most of the island of Osterøy. The administrative centre of Osterøy is the village of Lonevåg in the central part of the island. The largest settlement is the village of Valestrandfossen with 1,219 inhabitants as of 1 January 2016.

Osterøy municipality and Vaksdal Municipality are both located on the island of Osterøy. Osterøy municipality covers most of the island with the mostly uninhabited northeastern part of the island belonging to Vaksdal municipality. Osterøy is located a short distance northeast of the city of Bergen. It is surrounded by the Osterfjorden, Sørfjorden, and Veafjorden. The 19th-century musician and composer Ole Bull had a summer home in Valestrandfossen in Osterøy. The historic Havrå farm is a cluster farm which represents the traditional way of living for farmers. Havrå is located on the southeastern part of the municipality.

The  municipality is the 284th largest by area out of the 356 municipalities in Norway. Osterøy is the 129th most populous municipality in Norway with a population of 8,131.

Geography

The municipality sits on the island of Osterøy, and it is surrounded by several fjords: Osterfjorden-Romarheimsfjorden, Sørfjorden, and Veafjorden. The Lonevågen fjord cuts in the center of the island, with the village of Lonevåg sitting at the end of the fjord.

Settlements
Osterøy contains six "urban settlements", as defined by Statistics Norway (with populations listed from 1 January 2016): Valestrandfossen (1,218 inhabitants), Lonevåg (875 inhabitants), Hausvik (655 inhabitants), Haugo (617 inhabitants), Fotlandsvåg (320 inhabitants), and Hamre (217 inhabitants).  Other rural settlements in Osterøy include Austbygdi, Bruvik, Gjerstad, and Hosanger.

History

The municipality of Osterøy was created on 1 January 1964 as part of a major municipal merger that was proposed by the Schei Committee. Osterøy was created from parts of four different municipalities that were all dissolved in the merger. The following areas were merged to form the new municipality of Osterøy:
all of Haus municipality that was located on Osterøy island (population: 2,327)
the Bruvikbygda area of Bruvik municipality that was located on Osterøy island (population: 409)
all of Hosanger municipality that was located on Osterøy island (population: 1,616)
all of Hamre municipality that was located on Osterøy island (population: 1,166)

Name
The municipality was named after the island on which it is located. The Old Norse form of the name was "Ostr". The last element "øy" which means "island" in Norwegian was added later. The meaning of the name is unknown. It is possible that it comes from the word "óstr" which means "east".

Culture

Coat of arms
The coat of arms for Osterøy municipality is a relatively new creation; it was granted on 20 December 1985. It shows three blue broad axes pointing downwards on a field of white, with two axes at the top and one beneath. Broad axes are used in the construction of timber houses, which has long traditions in the municipality. The designer was Egil Korsnes who based his design on the idea of Magnus Hardeland.

Churches
The Church of Norway has five parishes within the municipality of Osterøy. It is part of the Åsane prosti (deanery) in the Diocese of Bjørgvin.

Government
All municipalities in Norway, including Osterøy, are responsible for primary education (through 10th grade), outpatient health services, senior citizen services, unemployment and other social services, zoning, economic development, and municipal roads. The municipality is governed by a municipal council of elected representatives, which in turn elect a mayor.  The municipality falls under the Hordaland District Court and the Gulating Court of Appeal.

Municipal council
The municipal council of Osterøy is made up of 27 representatives that are elected to four year terms. The party breakdown of the council is as follows:

Mayor
The mayors of Osterøy (incomplete list):
2019–present: Lars Fjeldstad (Sp)
2015-2019: Jarle Skeidsvoll (KrF)
2003-2015: Kari Foseid Aakre (Ap)

Transport

Osterøy is connected to the mainland by a ferry from Breistein to Valestrand, and by a bridge on the far southern end of the island. The ferry named "Ole Bull" is sailing every half-hour from Breistein and Valestrand from early morning to late in the evening. 
The Osterøy Bridge, finished in 1997, provides Osterøy with its only permanent road connection to the mainland in Bergen municipality. Since 2015, the bridge has been toll-free. There are no road connections from Osterøy municipality to the Vaksdal municipality part of Osterøy island. That part of the island has the Kallestadsundet Bridge connecting it to the rest of Vaksdal municipality from the east.

People from Osterøy

 Jens Frølich Tandberg (1852 in Hausvik – 1922) the bishop of Oslo, 1912 to 1922
 Ola Raknes (1887–1975) a psychologist, philologist and non-fiction writer, grew up in Hamre
 Einar Selvik (born 1979), a musician primarily known for his work with Gorgoroth and for fronting Wardruna
 Sylvelin Vatle (born 1957), a novelist and children's writer
 Tore Eikeland, (Norwegian Wiki) (1990-2011), a politician

Sport 
 Mons Ivar Mjelde (born 1967), a former footballer with 287 club caps and coach
 Erlend Hanstveit (born 1981), a former footballer with 330 club caps
 Sigrid Borge (born 1995 in Hausvik) a Norwegian javelin thrower

See also
:nn:Bygdanytt, the local newspaper

References

External links

Municipal fact sheet from Statistics Norway 

 
Municipalities of Vestland
1964 establishments in Norway